The Women's Flat Track Derby Association Division 3 (WFTDA Division 3) was the third level of play in women's flat track roller derby, from 2013 through 2014.

Organisation
Historically, the Women's Flat Track Derby Association (WFTDA) operated four regions, based on geographic location: East, North Central, South Central and West. At the start of 2013, these were replaced by three divisions, each operating worldwide. However, foreseeing continued growth in membership, the WFTDA stated that future developments were likely to include new regional structures alongside the divisional system.

Division 1 comprised the top 40-ranked member leagues, and Division 2 comprised those ranked 41–100; Division 3 consisted of member leagues who were ranked below 100. WFTDA rankings are set at the start of each year, based on performance over the previous year. Although rankings are updated during the year, teams would only transfer between divisions at the start of each year. Teams which graduated from the WFTDA Apprentice Program during the year were placed in Division 3. After the 2014 tournament season, the definition of the WFTDA competitive divisions changed, and Division 2 was contracted from 60 teams (places 41–100) to 20 (only those teams qualifying for the WFTDA Division 2 tournament, places 41–60). With this update, in-season division assignments no longer applied, and as such Division 3 is no longer active.

Although there was no end-of-year Division 3 Playoff, teams in Division 3 could qualify for one of the end-of-year Division 1 or Division 2 playoff tournaments if they were ranked in WFTDA's top sixty at the end of June each year.

Member leagues
The initial Division 3 membership list was introduced ahead of the 2013 competitive season, comprising the teams that had been ranked at 26 and lower in each of the four previous geographic regions, plus teams that had yet to earn a rank. Teams were automatically added to Division 3 upon gaining membership. The final publication of Division 3 designation was in the October 2014 rankings release, and the below lists teams that were members at any time from the beginning of the designation, through October 2014.

Notes

References

 
Sports leagues established in 2013
Women's Flat Track Derby Association